Alice Shalvi ((born 16 October 1926) is an Israeli professor and educator. She has played a leading role in progressive Jewish education for girls and advancing the status of women.

Biography
Alice Hildegard  Margulies (later Shalvi) was born in Essen, Germany, to an Orthodox Jewish family. Her parents, Benzion and Perl Margulies, were religious Zionists. Alice was the youngest of two children. The family had a wholesale linen and housewares business.

In 1933, soon after Hitler's rise to power in Germany, the family home was searched, prompting their move to London in May 1934. In London, Shalvi's father and brother imported watches and jewellery. When the Blitz began, they moved to Aylesbury, 50 kilometers north of London, and lived in a small house in Waddesdon, which was part of the estate of James Rothschild.

The family built a factory there for ammunition calibration devices that established them financially. In 1944, Shalvi studied English literature at Cambridge University. In 1946, she was sent to the 22nd Zionist Congress in Basel as a representative of British Jewish students.

In 1949, after completing a degree in social work at the London School of Economics, Shalvi immigrated to Israel, settling in Jerusalem. She became a faculty member in the English department of the Hebrew University of Jerusalem, and earned her PhD there in 1962.

In May 1950 she met Moshe Shelkowitz (later Shalvi), a new immigrant from New York, whom she married in October of that year. They had six children: Joel (b. 1952), Micha (b. 1954), Ditza (b. 1957), Hephzibah (b. 1960), Benzion (b. 1963) and Pnina (Perl, b. 1967).

Moshe Shalvi died on 6 July 2013.

Academic and public career
Shalvi headed the English literature departments at the Hebrew University of Jerusalem and Ben-Gurion University of the Negev. She was the founder of Pelech, an experimental school for religious girls that unconventionally taught Talmud (1975–1990), and of the Ohalim movement of neighbourhood associations (1973–1979); she was also founding director (later chairwoman) of the Israel Women's Network (1984–2000). In the latter position, she was one of the most prominent feminist advocates in Israel, developing a program that covers most forms of discrimination and disadvantage faced by women in Israeli society. An important aim of her work was gaining acceptance of Israeli women's contributions in all sections and at all levels of the armed forces, since army service plays a significant role in Israeli economic, political, and social life. In the 1990s she founded the International Coalition for Agunah Rights. She also served as rector of the Schechter Institute for four years. Shalvi also serves as a member of the advisory board of the Remember the Women Institute In 2018 she published a memoir entitled Never A Native.

Awards and recognition
 In 1989, Shalvi received the Emil Grunzweig Human Rights Award, as founder of the Israel Women's Network.
 In 2007, she was awarded the Israel Prize for her lifetime achievement and special contribution to society and the State of Israel.
 In 2009, she was co-recipient (with Rabbi Arik Ascherman) of the Leibowitz Prize, named to commemorate Yeshayahu Leibowitz, presented by the Yesh Din human rights organisation for public activism in the spirit of Leibowitz's political and philosophical teaching.
 Shalvi sits on the board of The Israel/Palestine Center for Research and Information.
In 2017, she was honored with the Sylvan Adams Nefesh B'Nefesh Bonei Zion Prize Lifetime Achievement Award.
In 2018, she was awarded the National Jewish Book Award for Women's Studies for her book Never a Native.

Published works
Jewish Women: A Comprehensive Historical Encyclopedia
 Studies in English language and literature, 1966
 The relationship of Renaissance concepts of honour to Shakespeare's problem plays, 1972
 Never a native, 2018

See also
 List of Israel Prize recipients
 Jewish feminism
 Women in Israel

References

1926 births
Living people
Israeli Jews
German emigrants to Israel
Alumni of the University of Cambridge
Alumni of the London School of Economics
Academic staff of the Hebrew University of Jerusalem
Academic staff of Ben-Gurion University of the Negev
Israel Prize for lifetime achievement & special contribution to society recipients
Israel Prize women recipients
Israeli feminists
Jewish feminists
Jewish emigrants from Nazi Germany to the United Kingdom
People from Aylesbury Vale
Bonei Zion Prize recipients